The Nebraska Methodist Health System, also known as Bestcare, is a nonprofit Nebraskan healthcare organization that was founded in 1982. Its headquarters are located at 825 S. 169th Street in Omaha, Nebraska. The three major facilities in the system, Methodist Jennie Edmundson Hospital (Council Bluffs, Iowa), Methodist Women's Hospital (Elkhorn, Nebraska), and Methodist Hospital (Omaha, Nebraska), have served the Omaha-Council Bluffs metropolitan area for more than 120 years. Two dozen additional facilities in rural Nebraska and Iowa provide family practice services and specialties including pediatrics, behavioral health, radiology, and allergy care.

Created in 1982 by Methodist Hospital leaders, the system operates as a not-for-profit. There are 685 beds within the system, with facilities offering programs in obstetrics, neurology, cancer care, cardiology, rehabilitation, and geriatric care.

The Methodist Health System is affiliated with the Nebraska Methodist College.

See also
 Hospitals in Omaha
 Methodist Jennie Edmundson Hospital (Council Bluffs, Iowa)
 Methodist Women's Hospital (Elkhorn, Nebraska)
 Methodist Hospital (Omaha, Nebraska)

References

External links 
 Nebraska Methodist Health System

Organizations based in Omaha, Nebraska
Health care companies based in Nebraska
Healthcare in Omaha, Nebraska